The Kahlenberg Transmitter is a facility for FM- and TV on the Kahlenberg near Vienna. It was established in 1953 and used until 1956 an antenna on the observation tower Stefaniewarte. From 1956 to 1974 a 129-metre-high guyed mast built of lattice steel was used. Since 1974 a 165-metre-high guyed steel tube mast has been used, which is equipped with rooms of technical equipment.

See also
List of masts

References

External links
 
http://www.skyscraperpage.com/diagrams/?b10351

Radio masts and towers in Europe
Towers in Austria
Broadcast transmitters
Observation towers
1953 establishments in Austria
Towers completed in 1953
20th-century architecture in Austria